The 2014–15 DEL2 season was the second season of operation for the DEL2 (also known as DEL II). Replacing the 2nd Bundesliga, this league represents the second-level of ice hockey in Germany, below the Deutsche Eishockey Liga (DEL). The league operated with 14 teams during the 2014–15 season.

The league was won by the Bietigheim Steelers who also were the regular season winners and defeated the previous seasons champions, the Fischtown Pinguins, in the finals.

Regular season
The regular season saw one two new club in the league, Löwen Frankfurt EC Kassel Huskies, the league having expanded from 12 to 14 teams.

Playoffs

Championship
The championship play-offs:

Relegation
The relegation play-offs:

References

External links
 www.del-2.org, official website

2
Ger
2014-15 DEL2